Frederiksberg Ældre Kirkegård is a cemetery in Frederiksberg, Copenhagen. It was established in 1734 behind Frederiksberg Church.

Burials

 C.F. Gerner Andersen
 Kai Normann Andersen
 Peter Andersen
 Christian Augustinus
 Ludvig Augustinus
 William Augustinus
 Christian Bache
 Kristian Bahnson
 N.E. Bank-Mikkelsen
 Vilhelm Bardenfleth
 Frederik Barfod
 Thorkil Barfod
 Waldemar Gustav Otto Bauditz
 Johan Christian Theodor Bayer
 Julius August Bentzien
 Niels Viggo Bentzon
 Ole Berggreen
 Theodor Bergh
 F.J. Billeskov Jansen
 Gert Due Billing
 Børge Binderup
 Johanne Bindesbøll
 Michael Gottlieb Bindesbøll
 Thorvald Bindesbøll
 Anne Birch
 Ludvig Birkedal-Barfod
 Vilhelm Bjerring
 August Blom
 Holger Boland
 Kjeld Bonfils
 Ludvig Bramsen
 C.F. Bricka
 Edvard Brink
 Lily Broberg
 Ane Brügger
 Johannes Brøndsted
 Frederik Bøgh (forfatter) (nedlagt)
 Nicolai Bøgh
 Andreas Lorentz Casse
 Carl Claudius
 Jonas Collin
 Jonas Collin (zoolog)
 Ib Conradi
 Francesco Cristofoli
 Erik Dal
 Henrik Leonhard Danchell
 Augusta Dohlmann
 Carl Th. Dreyer
 Karl Einarson Dunganon
 Sofus Elvius
 Thomas Alfred English
 August Enna
 Jacob Erslev
 Kristian Erslev
 Poul Schack Eyber
 Ida Falbe-Hansen
 Povl Ole Fanger
 Lorry Feilberg
 Ludvig Feilberg
 Erik Fiehn (nedlagt)
 Philip Fischer
 N.J. Fjord
 Kate Fleron
 Flemming Flindt
 Kai Friis Møller
 Johanne Fritz-Petersen
 Ejnar Fugmann
 Aage Garde
 Louis Glass
 Asmund Gleerup
 Edvard Glæsel
 Ellen Gottschalch
 Jesper Gottschalch
 Peer Gregaard
 Gunnar Gregersen
 Svend Grundtvig
 Thorvald Gundestrup
 Erna Hamilton
 Constantin Hansen
 F.C.C. Hansen
 Johannes Harbou
 Uffe Harder
 Carl Harild
 Albert Helsengreen
 Axel Helsted
 Knud Ove Hilkier
 Geert Marinus Holbek
 Ludvig Holm
 Ludvig Holm
 Emil von Holstein-Rathlou
 N.P.C. Holsøe
 Poul Holsøe
 Kamilla Bech Holten
 Preben Hornung
 Carlo Hornung-Jensen
 Jens Christian Hostrup
 Sven Houmøller
 Georg Høeberg
 Jon Iversen
 Marius Jacobsen
 Jørgen Jensen
 Louis Jensen
 Lauritz Johansen
 Sigfred Johansen (lapidarium)
 Christian Juel
 Adolph Ditlev Jørgensen
 Harald Jørgensen
 Harald Kayser
 Andreas Kirkerup
 Adolph Kittendorff
 Axel Kittendorff
 Niels Kjærbølling
 Helge Kjærulff-Schmidt
 Marianne Kjærulff-Schmidt
 Hans Knudsen
 Bodil Koch
 Hal Koch
 Peter Christian Koch
 Brigitte Kolerus  
 Svend Kragh-Jacobsen
 Knud Kristensen
 Hans Kruuse
 Ebbe Langberg
 Johan Lange (1818-1898)
 Johan Lange (1911-2007)
 Aage Langeland-Mathiesen
 J.P. Langgaard
 Siegfried Langgaard
 Holger Laumann
 Carl Liebenberg
 M.F. Liebenberg
 F.L. Liebenberg
 Nathalie Lind
 Vera Lindstrøm
 Viggo Lindstrøm
 Carl Lund
 F.C. Lund
 Ib Lunding
 Tage Lyneborg
 Harald Lønborg-Jensen
 Ib Makwarth
 Karl Mantzius
 Kristian Mantzius
 Sven Methling
 Peter Johan Monrad
 Jurij Moskvitin
 Hans Mossin
 Max Müller
 Poul Müller
 Henrik Møll
 Herdis Møllehave
 Aksel Møller
 Poul Møller
 Johan Sigismund von Mösting
 Johan Ludvig Nathansen
 Jonna Neiiendam
 Nicolai Neiiendam
 Tavs Neiiendam
 Sophus Neumann
 Johannes Neye
 Anna Nielsen
 Nicolai Peter Nielsen
 Jens Nordsø
 Povl Norholt
 Sigbjørn Obstfelder
 Adam Oehlenschläger
 Flemming John Olsen
 John Olsen
 C.V. Oppermann
 Ida Ørskov
 Christian Otterstrøm
 Christian Rasmus Otterstrøm
 Thomas Overskou
 Julius Paludan
 Johannes Pedersen
 Storm P
 Emil Poulsen
 Adolph Price
 Birgitte Price
 James Price (1761-1805)
 James Price (1801-1865)
 John Price
 Mathilde Price
 Waldemar Price
 William Wain Prior
 Erik Paaske
 Flemming Quaade
 Kamma Rahbek
 Knud Lyne Rahbek
 Paul Ramm
 P.G. Ramm
 Svend Rathsack
 Ellen Carstensen Reenberg
 Holger Reenberg
 Johan Jochum Reinau
 Knud Rex
 Vilhelm Richter
 C.V. Rimestad
 Lise Ringheim
 Ebbe Rode
 Edith Rode
 Helge Rode
 Martin Rode
 Mikal Rode
 Tony Rodian
 N.C. Rom
 Holger Rosenberg
 Claudius Rosenhoff
 Orla Rosenhoff
 Sofie Rostrup
 Aage Roussell
 Hans Morten Rubin
 Olaf Rude
 Otto Rung
 Albert Rüdinger
 Svend Saaby
 Avi Sagild
 Siegfried Salomon
 Peter Salskov
 Axel Salto
 Henrik Sartou
 Edel Saunte
 Jacob Saxtorph-Mikkelsen
 N.F. Schlegel
 Lisbeth Schlüter
 Hans Schneekloth
 Philip Schou
 Monna Schoubye
 Emil Schwanenflügel
 Ebbe Schwartz
 Frederik Vilhelm Schytte
 Martin Gottlieb Schäffer
 Tommy Seebach
 Hans Hartvig Seedorff
 H.P. Selmer
 Kristian Sick
 Harald Simonsen
 Frede Skaarup
 Lis Smed
 Hans Smidth
 Julius Smith
 Olga Smith
 Carl Johan Sonning
 Adolph Steen
 Vilhelm Storch
 Hans Tabor
 Andreas Charles Teilman
 Martinus Thomsen
 Christian L. Thuren
 Ejnar Thuren
 Hjalmar Thuren
 Christian Tiemroth (violinist)
 Christian Tiemroth (politician)
 Carl Trock-Madsen
 Troels Frederik Troels-Lund
 Hans Trojel
 J.K. Blok Tøxen
 Olaf Ussing
 Stephan Ussing (billedhugger)
 Stephan Ussing (painter)
 W.J.A. Ussing
 Marguerite Viby
 Astrid Villaume
 N.H. Volkersen
 Aage von Kohl
 Mette von Kohl
Gertie Wandel
 Kurt Westi
 Johannes Wilhjelm
 Ferdinand von Wimpffen
 Arthur Wittmaack
 Johannes Wolf
 Lise Wolf
 Otto B. Wroblewski
 Anders Sandøe Ørsted
 Lisbeth Høgsbro Østergaard
 Johan Aagaard
 Christian Aarøe

External links 
 Kendtes gravsted
 Frederiksberg Kommunes kirkegårde

Cemeteries in Copenhagen
Buildings and structures in Frederiksberg Municipality
1734 establishments in Denmark
Cemeteries established in the 18th century